Emory Lamar Long (November 28, 1911 – March 6, 1976), nicknamed "Bang",  was an American baseball infielder in the Negro leagues. He played from 1932 to 1940 with several teams.

References

External links
 and Baseball-Reference Black Baseball stats and Seamheads

1911 births
1976 deaths
Atlanta Black Crackers players
Indianapolis Athletics players
Memphis Red Sox players
Philadelphia Stars players
20th-century African-American sportspeople
Baseball infielders